Haplophyllum may refer to:
 Haplophyllum (millipede), a genus of millipedes in the family Julidae
 Haplophyllum (plant), a genus of plants in the family Rutaceae